Periyakulam is a major town and a municipality in Theni district, in the Madurai Region, South Indian state of Tamil Nadu. As of 2011, the town had a population of 42,976. Periyakulam is the northern gateway of the district.

Etymology 

In Tamil literature, the name of this town is Kulainthai Managaram.

History 

There are three very old temples. The Balasubramaniam Swamy temple is located on the banks of the Varaha nadhi (Varaha river). Periyakovil Temple and Karanamoorthy Swamy temple are located on the Periyakulam pond. South east side Kailasanathar temple located in the hills.

Geography

Periyakulam is a small town most picturesquely situated on the palm fringed banks of the Varaganathi, a perennial river with the great wall of the Kodaikanal hills. It has an average elevation of 282 metres (925 feet). It is located at the foothills of the Western Ghats bordering the neighbouring state of Kerala. It is one of the most fertile places in the state of Tamil Nadu. Agriculture is the primary occupation for the population here. It is also known as the "Mango City", as a major supply of mangoes from this city goes into Tamil Nadu's mango output. It stands on the bank of the 'Varaha' (in Hindu mythology, Lord Maha Vishnu's Boar incarnation) river. It is a fertile area that has an annual supply of surplus rainfall. Periyakulam riverine wetland is situated at latitude 8°10'26"North and longitude 77°18'36"East in Udayar pallam, Kanyakumari District, Tamil Nadu. The average rainfall of that area is 145 cm. The water of the wetland is mainly used for drinking and irrigation purposes. The villages that are included are Keelavadakarai, Kailasapatti, T. Kallipatti, Thamarai kulam, Vadugapatti, Melmangalam and Jeyamangalam villages that also stand on the banks of the Varaha River. The original town was near New ground but later shifted due to plague scare.

Topography 

It has an average elevation of 356 m above mean sea level.

Climate  
The climate is salubrious, with northeast monsoon rains during October–December. Temperatures during summer reach a maximum of 40 °C and a minimum of 26.3 °C, though temperatures over 43 °C are not uncommon. Winter temperatures range between 29.6 °C and 18 °C.  The average annual rainfall is about 105 cm. The lowest temperature reached in 2019 was 14.1 °C.

Demographics

Population 
According to 2011 census, Periyakulam had a population of 42,976 with a sex-ratio of 1,013 females for every 1,000 males, much above the national average of 929. A total of 4,095 were under the age of six, constituting 2,081 males and 2,014 females. Scheduled Castes and Scheduled Tribes accounted for 15.02% and 0.01% of the population respectively. The average literacy of the town was 79.84%, compared to the national average of 72.99%. The town had a total of 11,401 households. There were a total of 14,857 workers, comprising 523 cultivators, 3,051 main agricultural labourers, 272 in house hold industries, 9,492 other workers, 1,519 marginal workers, 25 marginal cultivators, 809 marginal agricultural labourers, 60 marginal workers in household industries and 625 other marginal workers.

The population has been declining since the 1990s. According to World Gazetteer the population as of 2012 is only 39,185 down from 46,744 in 1991 which would mean that Periyakulam has only 8,000 people more than it did in 1951. This would make it one of the few cities in India to have a marginal population increase since 1951.

Languages 
Tamil is spoken predominantly in and around Periyakulam. Madurai Tamil is the standard dialect spoken.

Government and politics  

Periyakulam was a Lok sabha constituency. Now Periyakulam assembly constituency is a part of Theni (Lok Sabha constituency).
Mr. O. Panneerselvam,  Periyakulam assembly constituency in 2001 and 2006. He is now  elected from Bodinayakkanur constituency. Periyakulam comes under Theni Lok Sabha Constituency and is now represented by Ravindhranath.

Culture/Cityscape 
Periyakulam is also known as ‘Mango City’ and is known for its sweet Mangoes. Periyakulam is also known for its sweet water which comes from the Berijam Lake kodaikanal. It has nice weather throughout the year.

Periyakulam is an undesigned river-based settlement city which located "Theni district" in India. The city has been divided into two major divisions by the river: Thenkarai (southern part) and Vadakarai (northern part). The streets around the city are based upon communal settlements symbolizing the structure of the cosmos.  It owns rich resources with bunch of historical relics such as "archaeological vestiges, inscriptions and ancient temples". It is also regarded as a "holy space" that catches people's attention.

Tourist Attractions 
Periyakulam itself has so many tourist places; also around Periyakulam, you can find a number of tourist locations. To name a few, Sothuparai Dam (9 km), Kumbakarai Falls (8 km), Theertha Thotti (2 km), Vaigai Dam (15 km), Manjalar Dam (18 km), Kodaikanal (49 km via Kumbakarai, Adukkam) (72 km via devathanapatty) Thekkady  (80 km), Surulithirtham (60 km), Munnar (103 km) and many more. MaruthaNayagam Masjid located in Vadagarai (legs of Marutha Nayagam was buried in this Masjid).

Kumbakkarai waterfalls are located 8 km away from Periyakulam. This waterfalls was supposed to be a very dangerous waterfalls with lot of pits. Hence people used to be afraid to go near to the falls. In 1942 an affluent business person  Thiru K Chellam Iyer Properitor of Bavani Krishna Vilas Hotel - Periyakulam, dredged the entire falls area, closed the dangerous holes, constructed dressing rooms, in the falls and staircases for safe access to the falls. With his efforts Kumbakkarai waterfalls developed to be a tourist spot.

Education 

The school at Periyakulam is Victoria Memorial High School which caters to education in the town.

The Horticultural College & Research Institute (HC & RI), one of the constituency colleges of Tamil Nadu Agricultural University, is located at Periyakulam. Government Nursing college is located at Periyakulam.

Colleges

 Jayaraj Annapakiyan College of arts and Science, Tamarikulam post, government 
 Government college of Horticulture 
 VPV college of engineering, D. Vadipatti post 
 Mary Matha college of arts and Science 
 Government College of Nursing, Theni district head govt hospital 
 Devangar Polytechnic College 
 Thanga muthu Polytechnic College 
 Thiraviyam group of institutions

Notable people 
 Bala, film director; National Film Award for best direction
 Mu. Metha, Tamil poet
 O. Panneerselvam, Former Chief Minister of Tamil Nadu
 Singampuli, film actor
 Major Sundarrajan, film actor
 S.Monish Kumar , Best doctor; National doctor winner

References

Further reading

External links
 
 Homepage of Periyakulam municipality

Cities and towns in Theni district